Orcas Island is the largest of the San Juan Islands of the Pacific Northwest, which are in the northwestern corner of San Juan County, Washington.

History and naming of the island
The name "Orcas" is a shortened form of Horcasitas, from Juan Vicente de Güemes Padilla Horcasitas y Aguayo, 2nd Count of Revillagigedo, the Viceroy of New Spain who sent an exploration expedition under Francisco de Eliza to the Pacific Northwest in 1791. During the voyage, Eliza explored part of the San Juan Islands. He did not apply the name Orcas specifically to Orcas Island, but rather to part of the archipelago. In 1847, Henry Kellett assigned the name to Orcas Island during his reorganization of the British Admiralty charts. Kellett's work eliminated the patriotically American names that Charles Wilkes had given to many features of the San Juans during the Wilkes Expedition of 1838–1842. Wilkes had named Orcas Island "Hull Island" after Commodore Isaac Hull. Other features of Orcas Island Wilkes named include "Ironsides Inlet" for East Sound and "Guerrier Bay" for West Sound. One of the names Wilkes gave remains: Mount Constitution. Wilkes's names follow a pattern: Hull was the commander of "Old Ironsides" (the ) and won fame after capturing the British warship HMS Guerriere in the War of 1812. The islands were first claimed by Spain, then by Britain, who agreed that everything below the 49th parallel was part of the US, in the treaty signed after the War of 1812. The Oregon territory, which then included Washington state and this island, was used jointly by the US and Britain until 1848, but border disputes specifically concerning the San Juan Islands, including the Pig War (1859), were not settled until 1871. The similarity to the name of the orca, which is popularly associated with coastal Washington state, is coincidental.

Geography
It is shaped like a pair of saddlebags, separated by fjord-like Eastsound, and two prominent bays, Westsound and Deer Harbor, on the southwest side. At the island's northern end is the village of Eastsound, the largest population center on Orcas and the second largest in San Juan County.

Other, smaller hamlets on the island include Orcas Landing (where the inter-island/mainland ferry lands), West Sound (with Eastsound addresses), Deer Harbor, Rosario (with Eastsound addresses), Olga and Doe Bay. A number of former settlements no longer exist, which were mostly built up around the lime kiln and fruit growing industries.

Island access 
The state supports island access through the Washington State Ferries system. In addition, the island can be accessed through a variety of air, seaplane and sea charter services. Private watercraft can use public docks located near the villages around the island, and various public shoreline access points. During the summer season, there is an island shuttle van that runs from the ferry landing to Eastsound and other points.

Museums and media
 The Orcas Island Historical Museum is located down town Eastsound and is the only object-based, interpretive heritage facility for the island, with a permanent collection containing approximately 6000 objects, paper documents and photographs.
Crow Valley School Museum is a one-room school house built in 1888, open by appoint only.
 Orcas Island is also home to three historic camps: Camp Orkila, Four Winds Westward Ho and Camp Indralaya.
 The Islands' Sounder, originally named the Orcas Sounder, is a weekly newspaper published in Eastsound since 1964.

Public services
The Orcas Island School District operates three schools on a single campus: Orcas Island Elementary School housed in the island's historic Nellie S. Milton school building; Orcas Island Middle School; and Orcas Island High School.  All of the island's public schools are located in Eastsound.

The Orcas Island Public Library is located in Eastsound and serves a population of approximately 6,000 card holders.  The Orcas Island Library District is a junior-taxing district that funds the Orcas Island Public Library's operating budget through property taxes. The annual Library Fair sells books donated by Orcas Island residents and visitors, the proceeds of which are donated back to the Library's operating budget.

In 2018 Orcas Island Voters approved the creation of San Juan County Public Hospital District #3 (OIHCD) and later elected five Commissioners to the board. OIHCD funds local health care services ensuring care services to locals.

Parks

Village Green

The Village Green is located in the center of Eastsound village. The Village Green, with an expansive lawn and shade trees, picnic tables and outdoor performance stage, is the site of community gatherings, music performances, and the weekly farmer’s market.

Buck Park
Buck Park is located just north of the school on Mt. Baker Road. The park includes a world-class skateboard park, tennis courts, pickleball courts, baseball/softball and ultimate frisbee fields, soccer pitch, sand volleyball court, a fenced dog off-leash area, a new state-of-the-art running track, and the hub to a network of running trails and walking paths through the Eastsound area.

Moran State Park
Mount Constitution (elevation  is the highest point in the San Juan islands. The mountain is part of Moran State Park, the largest public recreation area in the San Juan Islands, and the largest State Park in Washington.

Obstruction Pass State Park
Obstruction Pass State Park is an 76-acre park with access to more than a mile of public saltwater shoreline on the south end of Orcas Island, south of Moran State Park.

Madrona Point
Madrona Point is a traditional burial ground which was controversially sold by the Cemetery Association in 1890. In 1989, the site was purchased out of private ownership for $2.2 million from the Department of the Interior and returned to the Lummi Nation. The tribe agreed to manage the property as an open space open to individuals and groups under a memorandum of understanding with San Juan County. However, the Lummi Nation closed the site in 2007 citing disrespect to the land.

In popular culture
The 2011 Film Your Sister's Sister starring Emily Blunt was partially filmed on Orcas Island.

The 2017 video game What Remains of Edith Finch takes place on Orcas Island.

The 2022 Netflix Original film Lou takes place on Orcas Island.

References

External links

 Moran State Park on Orcas Island
 Deer Harbor
 Orcas Island Chamber of Commerce (Orcas Island)
 Orcas Island Heritage
 Orcas Island Historical Museum
 
 Orcas Island 
 Orcas Today
 Orcas Island Film Festival

San Juan Islands